Project Runway is a competitive reality television series focusing on fashion design. In Poland it is shown on the TVN. The show follows a group of fashion designers as they compete against each other to avoid being "the next fashion victim" and win the competition. The programme is based upon the US reality show Project Runway.

Format
Project Runway is hosted by a celebrity and judged by a panel with three permanent judges and a 4th  guest judge - typically a fashion designer, fashion model or celebrity from the fashion industry. Tomasz Ossoliński, fashion designer, appears as a mentor for the designers giving his criticism of their garments and offering support.  The program takes place in Warsaw with designers using a workroom and living together.

The fashion models who work with the designers throughout the season are also in competition.  At the beginning of each episode, the designer who won the previous week's challenge is compelled to switch two models (not necessarily including his/her own), and at the end, the model who wore the losing design is automatically eliminated.  Included in the prize package for the winning model is coverage in the Polish edition of ELLE magazine.

Season 1 (2014)

Designers

Special guests
 1 episode - Ina Lekiewicz
 2 episode - Dorota Williams
 3 episode - Dorota Roqueplo
 4 episode - Weronika Pietras
 5 episode - Robert Kupisz
 6 episode - Marcin Paprocki, Mariusz Brzozowski
 7 episode - Gosia Baczyńska
 8 episode - Michał Piróg, Anna Jurgaś
 9 episode - Marcin Prokop, Dorota Wellman
 10 episode - Marcin Tyszka, Ina Lekiewicz
 11 episode - Sasha Knezevic
 12 episode - Katarzyna Sokołowska
 13 episode - Anthony Vaccarello

Special guest models
 9 episode - Marcin Prokop, Dorota Wellman
 10 episode - Ewa Wladymiruk
 13 episode - Małgorzata Rozenek (for Jakub Bartnik), Agnieszka Szulim (for Maciej Sieradzky), Anna Wendzikowska (for Liliana Pryma)

Designer progress

 The designer came in second but did not win the challenge.
 The designer won Project Runway Poland.
 The designer won the challenge.
 The designer lost and was eliminated from the competition.
 The designer had one of the lowest scores for that challenge, but was not eliminated.
 The designer was one of the bottom entries in an individual elimination challenge, and was the last person to advance.
 The designer won competition and did not have to compete in the next episode.
 The designer was on the winning team in the Team Challenge

Season 2 (2015)

Designers

Special guests
 1 episode - Jacob Birge (1st season winner)
 2 episode - Ranita Sobańska
 3 episode - Maryla Rodowicz
 4 episode - Sara Boruc
 5 episode - Maciej Zień
 6 episode - Małgorzata Rozenek
 7 episode - Anna Jurgaś, Tomasz Ossoliński
 8 episode - Anna Dereszowska, Ewa Minge
 9 episode - Weronika Rosati, Teresa Rosati
 10 episode - Marcin Paprocki, Mariusz Brzozowski
 11 episode - Monika Olejnik, Monika Stukonis
 13 episode - Karolína Kurková

Special guests models
 2 episode - members of the volleyball team Legionowo
 3 episode - Maryla Rodowicz
 9 episode - Family of the members
 12&13 episode - Michał Szpak (for Patryk Wojciechowski), Mateusz Maga (for Anna Młynarczyk), Marcin 'Madox' Majewski (for Michał Zieliński)

Designer progress

 The designer came in second but did not win the challenge.
 The designer won Project Runway Poland.
 The designer won the challenge.
 The designer lost and was eliminated from the competition.
 (LOW) The designer was one of the bottom entries in an individual elimination challenge, but was not the last person to advance.
 (LOW) The designer was one of the bottom entries in an individual elimination challenge, and was the last person to advance.
 The designer won competition and did not have to compete in the next episode.
 The designer was on the winning team in the Team Challenge

Ratings - Season 1 (2014)

Ratings - Season 2 (2015)

External links

Project Runway
2014 Polish television seasons
2014 in fashion
2014 Polish television series debuts
TVN (Polish TV channel) original programming
Polish fashion